4-Fluoro-alpha-PHP (4F-PHP) is a recreational designer drug from the substituted cathinone family with stimulant effects, which first appeared on the illicit market in around 2017.

See also 
 α-PHP
 3F-PVP
 3F-NEH
 3F-PiHP
 4F-PVP
 4Cl-PVP
 4F-POP
 MFPVP
 MDPHP
 N-Ethylhexedrone
 N-Ethylhexylone

References 

Pyrrolidinophenones
Designer drugs
Fluoroarenes